The hepatorenal ligament is the fold of peritoneum that extends from the lower posterior surface of the liver to the anterior surface of the right kidney. It forms the right margin of the lesser sac.


Structure 
The hepatorenal ligament extends from the lower posterior surface of the liver to the anterior surface of the right kidney. It forms the right margin of the lesser sac.

History 
The term "hepatorenal ligament" is sometimes considered a synonym for the coronary ligament, and sometimes considered a component of it.

References

Abdomen
Hepatology
Ligaments of the torso